Northwestern Regional High School is a public regional high school located in Winsted, Connecticut, serving the towns of Barkhamsted, Colebrook, New Hartford and Norfolk. Northwestern Regional High School, a part of Regional School District No. 7, is located in the same building as Northwestern Regional Middle School, which serves grades 7 and 8.

History
Northwestern was founded in 1958 by an agreement between the towns of New Hartford, Colebrook, Norfolk, and Barkhamsted. Prior to the school's opening, students from these towns attended The Gilbert School. The school was built on land donated by Sterling Engineering, a local business. Over the years, it has expanded several times through additions to the building. Currently, public school students from the town of Hartland may attend a local high school of their choice, with Northwestern Regional included as an option. Students from Winchester and Winsted, Canton, and Torrington may attend Northwestern Regional if they are part of the school's agricultural education program.

Curriculum
Northwestern Regional High School students must earn 23 credits in order to graduate. Students must successfully complete 4 credits of English, 3 credits of mathematics, 3 credits of social studies (including 1 in U.S. History and 0.5 in civics), 2 credits of science (including 1 credit in biology), and 2 credits of arts or vocational education. The school has a large agricultural education program and also offers classes in business, industrial arts, and foreign languages.
Courses have four levels, with Level 1 classes being the most advanced and Level 4 courses designed as remedial classes.

Kindness In Motion program 
Every year Northwestern Regional High School holds a KIM (kindness in motion) grant project. Encouraging students to make a positive impact in their community. Each grant is worth $100, which is used to fund-raise money to donate to their cause.

Academics

Accreditation 
Northwestern Regional High School is accredited by the New England Association of Secondary Schools and Colleges.

References 

Educational institutions established in 1958
Schools in Litchfield County, Connecticut
Public high schools in Connecticut
1958 establishments in Connecticut